Diamantina Lakes Station, most commonly known as Diamantina Lakes, was a pastoral lease that once operated as a cattle station in central west Queensland, and is now Diamantina National Park, a national park.

The area is a mix of landscapes including sand dunes, claypans, sandstone mesas, gibber plains and river channels. The Diamantina River traverses the area meaning the plains are able to support extensive grasslands and have near-permanent naturally deep waterholes, fed by seasonal rains and the Great Artesian Basin.

The traditional owners of the area are the Maiawali and Karuwali peoples, who were well supported by the watercourses, ranges and plains in the area, and maintain a close spiritual connection with it.

History
The station was established in 1876 with a partnership between John Arthur Macartney and Hugh Louis Heber-Percy, who initially took up the lease. Heber-Percy stayed on at the property as a manager for many years. By 1881 the property had been put for auction by Macartney, Mayne and Percy and was stocked with 5,000 cattle.

Sidney Kidman acquired the property in 1908, paying A£25,000 for the station and all its stock.

Between 1914 and 1916 the area was struck by drought; about 10,000 cattle died on the station during this time. Kidman lost over 75,000 head of stock on all of his properties through the channel country, including Glengyle, Durham Downs, Innamincka and Sandringham Stations. Suffering financially, Kidman sold the property in 1918.

George Hooper and E. A. Trenenny formed a partnership and acquired the station, then later sold it to the Queensland Government. The two later purchased Davenport Downs Station but had to relinquish it for financial reasons.

In 1927 the government owned the station and sold it unstocked to a company that was still in the process of being formed, for the reserve price of A £10,000.

The Queensland Government purchased the property in 1992 and subsequently gazetted the  property, capable of holding up to 12,000 head of cattle, as the Diamantina National Park. A number of stock routes still exist, and are regularly used in the park.

See also
List of ranches and stations
List of the largest stations in Australia

References

Stations (Australian agriculture)
Pastoral leases in Queensland
1876 establishments in Australia
Diamantina Lakes, Queensland